The Four Brasil is a Brazilian reality television music competition based on an Israeli format called The Final Four. It is hosted by Xuxa Meneghel and originally judged by Aline Wirley, João Marcello Bôscoli and Leo Chaves, with Paulo Miklos replacing Leo on the panel in season two. The series premiered Wednesday, 6 February 2019 at 10:30 p.m. (BRT / AMT) on RecordTV. The winner is awarded a R$300.000 cash prize.

Series overview

Season synopses
Winners and runners-up are indicated in gold and silver, respectively.

Season 1 (2019)

The first season of The Four Brasil premiered on 6 February 2019, and concluded on 27 March 2019. After eight episodes, Ivan Lima was announced as the winner of the season, with Vivian Lemos as the runner-up. The final group of "The Four" also included Leo Mahuad and Nega.

Season 2 (2020)

The second season of The Four Brasil premiered on 8 March 2020, and concluded on 29 April 2020. After eight episodes, Alma Thomas was announced as the winner of the season, with Lucas Degasperi as the runner-up. The final group of "The Four" also included Sabrina Meirels and Ana Clemesha.

Ratings and reception

Brazilian ratings
All numbers are in points and provided by Kantar Ibope Media.

 : The first two episodes of season 2 aired on Sunday at 6:00 p.m.

References

External links
 The Four Brasil on R7.com

2019 Brazilian television series debuts
2020 Brazilian television series endings
Brazilian reality television series
Portuguese-language television shows
RecordTV original programming
Brazilian television series based on Israeli television series